This is a list of 2004 British incumbents.

UK government
 Monarch
 Head of State – Elizabeth II, Queen of the United Kingdom (1952–2022)
 Prime Minister
 Head of Government – Tony Blair, Prime Minister of the United Kingdom (1997–2007)
Deputy Prime Minister
 Deputy Head of Government – John Prescott, Deputy Prime Minister of the United Kingdom (1997–2007)
First Secretary of State
 John Prescott, First Secretary of State (1997–2007)
First Lord of the Treasury
 Tony Blair, First Lord of the Treasury (1997–2007)
Minister for the Civil Service
 Tony Blair, Minister for the Civil Service (1997–2007)
Chancellor of the Exchequer
 Gordon Brown, Chancellor of the Exchequer (1997–2007)
Second Lord of the Treasury
 Gordon Brown, Second Lord of the Treasury (1997–2007)
Secretary of State for Foreign and Commonwealth Affairs
 Jack Straw, Secretary of State for Foreign and Commonwealth Affairs (2001–2007)
Secretary of State for the Home Department
 Secretary of State for the Home Department –
 David Blunkett, Secretary of State for the Home Department (2001–2004)
 Charles Clarke, Secretary of State for the Home Department (2004–2007)
Secretary of State for Environment, Food and Rural Affairs
 Margaret Beckett, Secretary of State for Environment, Food and Rural Affairs (2001–2007)
Secretary of State for Transport
 Alistair Darling, Secretary of State for Transport (2002–2007)
Secretary of State for Scotland
 Alistair Darling, Secretary of State for Scotland (2003–2007)
Secretary of State for Health
 John Reid, Secretary of State for Health (2003–2007)
Secretary of State for Northern Ireland
 Paul Murphy, Secretary of State for Northern Ireland (2002–2007)
Secretary of State for Defence
 Geoff Hoon, Secretary of State for Defence (1999–2007)
Secretary of State for Trade and Industry
 Patricia Hewitt, Secretary of State for Trade and Industry (2001–2007)
Minister for Women and Equality
 Patricia Hewitt, Minister for Women and Equality (2001–2007)
Secretary of State for Culture, Media and Sport
 Tessa Jowell, Secretary of State for Culture, Media and Sport (2001–2007)
Secretary of State for Education and Skills
 Charles Clarke, Secretary of State for Education and Skills (2002–2007)
Secretary of State for Wales
 Peter Hain, Secretary of State for Wales (2002–2007)
Lord Privy Seal
 Peter Hain, Lord Privy Seal (2003–2007)
Leader of the House of Commons
 Peter Hain, Leader of the House of Commons (2003–2007)
Lord President of the Council
 Baroness Amos, Lord President of the Council (2003–2007)
Lord Chancellor
 Charles Falconer, Baron Falconer of Thoroton, Lord Chancellor (2003–2007)
Secretary of State for Constitutional Affairs
 Charles Falconer, Baron Falconer of Thoroton, Secretary of State for Constitutional Affairs (2003–2007)
Secretary of State for International Development
 Hilary Benn, Secretary of State for International Development (2003–2007)
Secretary of State for Work and Pensions
 Secretary of State for Work and Pensions –
 Andrew Smith, Secretary of State for Work and Pensions (2002–2004)
 Alan Johnson, Secretary of State for Work and Pensions (2004–)
Chancellor of the Duchy of Lancaster
 Chancellor of the Duchy of Lancaster –
 Douglas Alexander, Chancellor of the Duchy of Lancaster (2003–2004)
 Alan Milburn, Chancellor of the Duchy of Lancaster (2004–2007)

Devolved administrations

First Minister of Scotland
Jack McConnell (2001–2007)
Deputy First Minister of Scotland
Jim Wallace (1999–2005)
First Minister of Wales
Rhodri Morgan (2000–2009)

Religion
 Archbishop of Canterbury
Rowan Williams, Archbishop of Canterbury (2003–2012)
 Archbishop of York
 David Hope, Archbishop of York (1995–2005)

Royalty
 Prince consort
 The Duke of Edinburgh (m. 1947)
 Heir apparent
 The Prince of Wales (since 1958)

Leaders
2004
British